KESS-FM (107.1 MHz) is a commercial radio station licensed to Benbrook, Texas, and serving communities in the western sections of the Dallas-Fort Worth Metroplex.  It is owned and operated by the Uforia Audio Network, a division of TelevisaUnivision.  It has a Spanish-language contemporary hit radio format, simulcast with co-owned 107.9 KDXX in Lewisville, Texas.

KESS has an effective radiated power (ERP) of 100,000 watts, the maximum for non-grandfathered FM stations.  The transmitter is off Tin Top Estates Road in Horseshoe Bend.  While simulcast partner KDXX has a signal covering Dallas, Fort Worth and communities north of the Metroplex, into Oklahoma, KESS has a signal covering communities west of Fort Worth.  KESS broadcasts using HD Radio technology.

History
The station had been branded as "Estereo Latino" until February 19, 2009, when "La Que Buena" was moved from 107.9 FM (KESS-FM) and simulcast on 99.1 FM (KFZO). The Reggaeton station known as "La Kalle" was then moved to 107.9 FM and retooled to Latin Pop/CHR.

On June 23, 2011, KDXX changed its format from a simulcast of Regional Mexican-formatted KFZO 99.1 FM to Spanish adult hits, branded as "Recuerdo 107.1".

On June 28, 2012, KDXX changed the format back to Regional Mexican, branded as "La Jefa 107.1" and changed its call sign to KFZO.

On July 29, 2013 KFZO flipped to a simulcast of Spanish AC KDXX 99.1.  The following month, on August 9, 2013, KFZO swapped call letters with KESS-FM.

On September 28, 2014, 107.1 rebranded as "Latino Mix".

References

External links

 DFW Radio/TV History

ESS-FM
ESS-FM
Univision Radio Network stations
Contemporary hit radio stations in the United States
Latin rhythmic radio stations